The 1987 La Flèche Wallonne was the 51st edition of La Flèche Wallonne cycle race and was held on 15 April 1987. The race started in Spa and finished in Huy. The race was won by Jean-Claude Leclercq of the Toshiba team.

General classification

References

1987 in road cycling
1987
1987 in Belgian sport
1987 Super Prestige Pernod International